Francis Morgan Ayodélé Thompson,  (born 30 July 1958), better known as Daley Thompson, is a British former decathlete. He won the decathlon gold medal at the Olympic Games in 1980 and 1984, and broke the world record for the event four times. He was unbeaten in competition for nine years.

With four world records, two Olympic gold medals, three Commonwealth titles, and wins in the World and European Championships, Thompson is considered by many to be one of the greatest decathletes of all time. Robert Chalmers described him as "the greatest all-round athlete this country [United Kingdom] has ever produced."

Early life and education
Thompson was born in Notting Hill, London, the second son of a British Nigerian father, Frank Thompson, who ran a minicab firm, and Scottish mother, Lydia, from Dundee. When Thompson was six, his father left home. At seven years old, Lydia sent Thompson to Farney Close Boarding School, Bolney, Sussex, which he described as "a place for troubled children". When Thompson was eleven or twelve, his father was shot dead in Streatham by the husband of a woman whom the father and a friend had dropped off. Thompson's forename is a contraction of Ayodelé, a Yoruba word meaning "joy comes home". Thompson's first ambition was to become a professional footballer, but he later switched his interests to athletics.

Athletics

Early career
Initially, he was a member of Haywards Heath Harriers, but when he returned to London in 1975 he joined the Newham and Essex Beagles Athletics club, training as a sprinter. He began to be coached by Bob Mortimer, who suggested he try for decathlon. He competed in his first decathlon later that year in Cwmbran, Wales, which he won along with his next competition. In 1976, he won the AAA title and was 18th at the Montréal Olympic Games. The following year, he won the European Junior title and in 1978 came the first of his three Commonwealth titles. In 1979, he failed to finish in his only decathlon of that year, but won the long jump at the UK Championships.

1980-1986 Breaking records
Thompson opened the 1980 Olympic season with a world decathlon record of 8,648 points at Götzis, Austria, in May, and followed this by winning gold at the Moscow Olympics. After a quiet 1981 season, he was in top form in 1982; back at Götzis in May, he raised the world record to 8,730 points and then in September, at the European Championships in Athens, he took the record up to 8,774 points. The following month in Brisbane, Thompson took his second Commonwealth title.

In 1983, Thompson won the inaugural World Championships and became the first decathlete to hold a continental title, in his case the European title, and the World and Olympic titles simultaneously. He also became by virtue of his World title, the first athlete in any athletics event to hold Olympic, World, continental and Commonwealth Games titles in a single event simultaneously.

Thompson spent much of the summer of 1984 in California preparing for the defence of his Olympic title, with Jürgen Hingsen, the West German who had succeeded Thompson as the world record holder, expected to be a major threat. Thompson took the lead in the first event, a lead he never relinquished throughout the competition. It seemed that, by easing off in the 1,500 metres, he had missed tying the world record by just one point. When the photo-finish pictures were examined, however, it was found that Thompson should have been credited with one more point in the 110 metres hurdles so he had in fact, equalled Hingsen's record. Then when the new scoring tables were introduced, Thompson became the sole record holder once more with a recalculated score of 8,847 points – a world record that stood until 1992, when it was surpassed by the American athlete Dan O'Brien with a score of 8,891. Thompson's two victories in the Olympic decathlon are a feat shared only with the Americans Bob Mathias and Ashton Eaton. Thompson's 1984 performance is still the UK record. In 2002, Thompson's successful defence of his Olympic title was ranked number 34 on Channel 4's poll of the 100 Greatest Sporting Moments.

1987-1990 Defeat and injury
Thompson won his third Commonwealth title in 1986 and also won another European Championship but after that he never quite recaptured the superlative form of earlier years. In 1987, he suffered his first decathlon defeat for nine years when he finished ninth in the World Championships, and at his fourth Olympics in Seoul in 1988 he finished fourth. He made the Commonwealth Games team for the fourth time in 1990, but was forced to withdraw because of injury.

Rivalry with Jürgen Hingsen
Thompson's rivalry with West German athlete Jürgen Hingsen was legendary in the sport throughout the 1980s. The pair constantly traded world records, but Thompson always had the upper hand in the major events, remaining undefeated in all competitions for nine years between 1978 and 1987.

Promotional activities
Thompson was also well known for his appearances in commercials for the drink Lucozade in the 1980s. Thompson's name was used for three officially licensed home computer games by Ocean Software in the 1980s: Daley Thompson's Decathlon, Daley Thompson's Supertest and Daley Thompson's Olympic Challenge. He is also a brand ambassador for a travel agency network "Not Just Travel".

After athletics
Thompson was forced to retire from athletics in 1992, due to a persistent hamstring injury. In the 1990s, he briefly played reserve team football for Mansfield Town and played one first-team game for Non-League side Stevenage F.C. before having a short spell at Non-League side Ilkeston F.C. 

He also worked as fitness coach for Wimbledon F.C. and Luton Town football clubs. He also took part in motorsport, entering the Ford Credit Fiesta Challenge Championship in 1994. Thompson worked as a fitness trainer and motivational speaker, as well as appearing at corporate events. In 1994 Thompson trained with Reading Football Club and even scored in a friendly against Leatherhead.

Thompson was an ambassador for the London 2012 Summer Olympics, focusing during the bid stage on highlighting the benefits that hosting the Olympics would bring to education and sport in schools. He also took part in the 2011 TV series Jamie's Dream School.

In 2015, Thompson opened his own gym, Daley Fitness, located on Upper Richmond Road in London. In 2018, he joined Masterchef Gary Barnshaw and co founded DT10 Sports, creating & selling a range of low-sugar protein shakes and sports bars.

Public persona
Thompson was a natural showman who endeared himself to the British public with his irreverent personality and anti-establishment attitude. He won the BBC Sports Personality of the Year award in 1982, and was appointed an MBE in the 1983 New Year Honours, and promoted to the CBE in the 2000 New Year Honours.

At the 1984 Los Angeles Olympics, Thompson, who had just won his second Olympic decathlon gold medal, wore a T-shirt that read "IS THE
WORLD'S SECOND GREATEST ATHLETE GAY?". United States sprinter Carl Lewis had been dealing with rumours of homosexuality and the shirt was regarded as being cruelly directed at Lewis. "The second athlete could be anybody, Carl Lewis, anybody" Thompson stated.

In 2012, he was accused of Anti-Irish sentiment after commenting on live BBC TV that the creator of a misspelled tattoo "must have been Irish". The tattoo artist was actually American.

In August 2014, Thompson was one of 200 public figures who were signatories to a letter to The Guardian expressing their hope that Scotland would vote to remain part of the United Kingdom in September's referendum on that issue.

In 2015, Thompson co-presented the mid morning show on talkSPORT once a week alongside Colin Murray until Murray quit the station  the following year.

Personal life
Thompson has two children with his girlfriend Lisa, and three with ex-wife Tish. Thompson has sporting sons Elliot and Alex. Elliot Thompson became the national decathlon champion at the 2022 British Athletics Championships. The title was won 46 years after Daley claimed his first national title. Alex plays rugby for the University of Bath and England Sevens.

References

External links
 
 
 DT10 Sports
 50 Olympic moments – Daley Thompson – can be used to expand article

Living people
1958 births
People from Worcester Park
Footballers from the London Borough of Sutton
British decathletes
English decathletes
British male athletes
Olympic athletes of Great Britain
English Olympic medallists
Olympic gold medallists for Great Britain
Athletes (track and field) at the 1976 Summer Olympics
Athletes (track and field) at the 1980 Summer Olympics
Athletes (track and field) at the 1984 Summer Olympics
Athletes (track and field) at the 1988 Summer Olympics
Commonwealth Games gold medallists for England
Commonwealth Games silver medallists for England
Commonwealth Games medallists in athletics
Athletes (track and field) at the 1978 Commonwealth Games
Athletes (track and field) at the 1982 Commonwealth Games
Athletes (track and field) at the 1986 Commonwealth Games
World Athletics Championships medalists
European Athletics Championships medalists
World record setters in athletics (track and field)
Black British sportsmen
English people of Nigerian descent
English people of Yoruba descent
English people of Scottish descent
Stevenage F.C. players
People educated at Farney Close School
BBC Sports Personality of the Year winners
Yoruba sportspeople
Medalists at the 1984 Summer Olympics
Medalists at the 1980 Summer Olympics
Commanders of the Order of the British Empire
Olympic gold medalists in athletics (track and field)
Association footballers not categorized by position
English footballers
Ilkeston Town F.C. (1945) players
Luton Town F.C. non-playing staff
Wimbledon F.C. non-playing staff
World Athletics Championships winners
Medallists at the 1978 Commonwealth Games
Medallists at the 1982 Commonwealth Games
Medallists at the 1986 Commonwealth Games